Tachina ursina is a species of fly in the genus Tachina of the family Tachinidae that can be found in such European countries as Austria, Benelux, Czech Republic, France, Germany, Hungary, Italy, Poland, Romania, Scandinavia (except Norway), Spain, Switzerland, the United Kingdom and Ukraine.

References

Insects described in 1824
Diptera of Europe
ursina